Wald is a municipality  in the district of Ostallgäu in Bavaria in Germany.

The village Wald is located in the Allgäu region. The municipality of Wald belongs to the administrative community Seeg and is located in the administrative district of Bavarian Swabia. 

The state-recognized recreational resort Wald includes many surrounding hamlets: Barnstein, Bergers, Birngschwend, Geigers, Gemmels, houses, Herring, Hofen, Holzmanns, Kaltenbrunn, Kaufmanns, Kippach, Klosterhof, Neupolz, Öbele, Ofen, Stechele, Wetzlers, Wies, Wimberg.

Sights

External links 

 
  (PDF; 1,05 MB)

References 

Ostallgäu